The Alloa Coal Company was founded as a partnership in 1835 between William Mitchell, John Moubray, John Craich and David Ramsay. The partners obtained a lease to mine coal and ironstone on the lands of the Earl of Mar in Clackmannanshire. In the 1840s, Alloa coal was exported to Canada by the Ben Line in which Mitchell was a partner; the ships returned with Canadian timber.

The partnership was later managed by William Mitchell's sons Andrew and Alexander and had pits in Clackmannanshire, Stirlingshire, Fife and Perthshire. The partnership became a limited company in 1898, and was nationalised by the British Government in 1948.

Mines and pits operated by the Alloa Coal Company Ltd. included Zetland  and Craigrie Collieries  near Clackmannan, Devon Colliery  and Meta Colliery, near Fishcross, King o'Muirs Colliery near Tullibody, Tillicoultry Colliery. at Devonside, and Dollar Colliery   (West Pitgober Mine) east of Dollar village. Dollar Mine, as it was known under National Coal Board management, was the last survivor, continuing to supply coal by rail to Kincardine Power Station until 1973. 
 
Bannockburn Colliery at Cowie (Stirlingshire)  lay outside the Company's Clackmannanshire roots, and was formerly owned by Carron Company (ironworkers), presumably for assuring a supply of coking coal for their cupolas at Carron Works near Falkirk, although the mine also produced house coal and steam coal. This colliery had a later lease of life as a drift mine between 1953 and 1964. 
Before the advent of the railways, coal was transported from various of the Clackmannanshire mines to the Port and Glassworks in Alloa by the Wagon Way. Constructed by the Erskines of Mar in 1768, the Wagon Way was an early attempt at railway engineering using horse-drawn wagons running on wooden rails, later replaced by Swedish iron in 1785.

References

Coal companies of Scotland
Companies based in Clackmannanshire
Mining in Scotland
Non-renewable resource companies established in 1835
Energy companies established in 1835
1835 establishments in Scotland
Defunct companies of Scotland
1948 disestablishments in Scotland
Non-renewable resource companies disestablished in 1948
British companies established in 1835
Energy companies disestablished in 1948
Alloa
British companies disestablished in 1948
Defunct energy companies of the United Kingdom